Badibanga Ilunga (born 16 June 1972) is a Congolese footballer. He played in two matches for the DR Congo national football team in 1997 and 1998. He was also named in the DR Congo's squad for the 1998 African Cup of Nations tournament.

References

External links
 

1972 births
Living people
Democratic Republic of the Congo footballers
Democratic Republic of the Congo international footballers
1998 African Cup of Nations players
Place of birth missing (living people)
Association footballers not categorized by position
21st-century Democratic Republic of the Congo people